The Week International (often just referred to as The Week) is an after hours LGBT nightclub located in the city of São Paulo, Brazil. It opened in September 2004. Other branches were opened in Rio de Janeiro and Florianópolis.

References

External links 
 The Week International (São Paulo, Rio de Janeiro, Florianópolis) - Official website

LGBT nightclubs
2004 establishments in Brazil
LGBT culture in Brazil